Balearic Anticolonialist Group was a political organization in the Balearic Islands founded in January 1978. It was yet one more short-lived minority agent in the agitated political context of the Spanish Transition to democracy.

GAB campaigned for independence of the Balearic Islands from Spain, but, contrary to the typical view of radical nationalist left groups, it did not ask for the hypothetical independent Balearic islands to become a part of an equally hypothetical independent Països Catalans.

GAB was politically tied to the Communist Party of Spain (international) (PCE(i)).

References 

Defunct communist parties in Spain
Defunct nationalist parties in Spain
Left-wing nationalist parties
Political parties in the Balearic Islands
Secessionist organizations in Europe
Organizations established in 1978
1978 establishments in Spain